Billaea irrorata is a species of fly in the family Tachinidae.

Distribution
Austria, Belarus, Belgium, Bulgaria, Czech Republic, Denmark, Estonia, Finland, France, Germany, Greece, Hungary, Italy, Latvia, Netherlands, Poland, Romania, Russia, Slovakia, Slovenia, Spain, Sweden, Switzerland, Ukraine, U.K.

References

Dexiinae
Muscomorph flies of Europe
Insects described in 1826